Sun River Terrace is a village in Kankakee County, Illinois, United States. The population was 455 at the 2020 census. It is included in the Kankakee-Bradley, Illinois Metropolitan Statistical Area.

Geography
It sits on the southeast side of the Kankakee River, with Illinois Route 17 running along the southern boundary of the village.

Demographics

2020 census

Note: the US Census treats Hispanic/Latino as an ethnic category. This table excludes Latinos from the racial categories and assigns them to a separate category. Hispanics/Latinos can be of any race.

2000 Census
As of the census of 2000, there were 383 people, 140 households, and 97 families residing in the village. The racial makeup of the village was 10.18% White, 88.25% African American, 0.78% from other races, and 0.78% from two or more races. Hispanic or Latino of any race were 2.09% of the population.

There were 140 households, out of which 33.6% had children under the age of 18 living with them, 35.7% were married couples living together, 30.7% had a female householder with no husband present, and 30.7% were non-families. 27.1% of all households were made up of individuals, and 16.4% had someone living alone who was 65 years of age or older. The average household size was 2.74 and the average family size was 3.30.

In the village, the population was spread out, with 33.2% under the age of 18, 8.9% from 18 to 24, 23.0% from 25 to 44, 19.8% from 45 to 64, and 15.1% who were 65 years of age or older. The median age was 34 years. For every 100 females, there were 84.1 males. For every 100 females age 18 and over, there were 82.9 males.

The median income for a household in the village was $26,875, and the median income for a family was $31,875. Males had a median income of $22,344 versus $24,750 for females. The per capita income for the village was $11,692. About 14.3% of families and 17.5% of the population were below the poverty line, including 16.5% of those under age 18 and 19.6% of those age 65 or over.

References

Villages in Kankakee County, Illinois
Villages in Illinois
Majority-minority cities and towns in Kankakee County, Illinois